Grace Methodist Episcopal Church is a historic church located at 625 Connable Street in Petoskey, Michigan. It was added to the National Register of Historic Places in 1986.

The church was constructed between 1903 and 1908.

The Grace Methodist Episcopal Church is a single-story frame church building with a gabled roof. It has a projecting, gable-roof entrance vestibule in the front. The side walls contain wood-framed two-over-two windows with a simple cornice above. The gable of the entrance vestibule is clad with wood shingle, and the remainder of the walls of the building are sided with clapboard. Two small windows flank the main entrance.

References

Methodist churches in Michigan
Churches on the National Register of Historic Places in Michigan
Colonial Revival architecture in Michigan
Churches completed in 1903
Buildings and structures in Emmet County, Michigan
National Register of Historic Places in Emmet County, Michigan
Wooden churches in Michigan